= Lafayette Tharpe =

Lafayette Tharpe was an officer in the volunteer army during the Spanish American War, a longshoreman, and a political organizer and civil rights activist in Louisiana. He organized a boycott of a cotton shipper that refused to hire union members who were African American.

He was promoted to Lieutenant and served during the Spanish American War. He helped Colonel C. J. Crane raise the 9th Regiment United States Volunteer Infantry. He put his children in the custody of religious officials while serving. He received a pension for an infirmity received during his service.
